The Chipko movement is a forest conservation movement in India.

Today, beyond the eco-socialism hue, it is seen increasingly as an ecofeminist movement. Although many of its leaders were men, women were not only its backbone, but also its mainstay, because they were the ones most affected by the rampant deforestation, which led to a lack of firewood and fodder as well as water for drinking and irrigation. Over the years they also became primary stakeholders in a majority of the afforestation work that happened under the Chipko movement. In 1987, the Chipko movement was awarded the Right Livelihood Award "for its dedication to the conservation, restoration and ecologically-sound use of India's natural resources."

Background 
Inspired by Jayaprakash Narayan and the Sarvodaya movement, in the year 1964 Dasholi Gram Swarajya Sangh ("Dasholi Society for Village Self-Rule"), was set up by Gandhian social worker Chandi Prasad Bhatt in Chamoli Gopeshwar, with an aim to set up small industries using the resources of the forest. Their first project was a small workshop making farm tools for local use. Its name was later changed to DGSM from the original Dashauli Gram Swarajya Sangh (DGSS) in the 1980s. Here they had to face restrictive forest policies, a hangover of colonial era still prevalent, as well as the "contractor system", in which these pieces of forest land were commodified and auctioned to big contractors, usually from the plains, who brought along their own skilled and semi-skilled laborers, leaving only the menial jobs like hauling rocks for the hill people, and paying them next to nothing. On the other hand, the hill regions saw an influx of more people from the outside, which only added to the already strained ecological balance.

Hastened by increasing hardships, the Garhwal Himalayas soon became the centre for a rising ecological awareness of how reckless deforestation had denuded much of the forest cover, resulting in the devastating Alaknanda River floods of July 1970, when a major landslide blocked the river and affected an area starting from Hanumanchatti, near Badrinath to 320 kilometers (200 miles) downstream till Haridwar, further numerous villages, bridges and roads were washed away. Thereafter, incidences of landslides and land subsidence became common in an area which was experiencing a rapid increase in civil engineering projects.

Event
Villagers including women began to organise themselves under several smaller groups. It was started in 1973, taking up local causes with the authorities, and stand up against commercial logging operations that threatened their livelihoods. In October 1971, the Sangha workers held a demonstration in Gopeshwar to protest against the policies of the Forest Department. More rallies and marches were held in late 1972, but to little effect, until a decision to take shaurya direct action was taken. The first such occasion occurred when the Forest Department turned down the Sangh's annual request for ten ash trees for its farm tools workshop, and instead awarded a contract for 300 trees to Simon Company, a sporting goods manufacturer in distant Allahabad, to make tennis racquets. In March 1973, the lumbermen arrived at Gopeshwar, and after a couple of weeks, they were confronted at village Mandal on 24 April 1973, where about a hundred villagers and DGSS workers were beating drums and shouting slogans, thus forcing the contractors and their lumbermen to retreat.

This was the first confrontation of the movement, The contract was eventually cancelled and awarded to the Sangh instead. By now, the issue had grown beyond the mere procurement of an annual quota of the ash trees and encompassed a growing concern over commercial logging and the government's forest policy, which the villagers saw as unfavourable towards them. The Sangh also decided to resort to tree-hugging, or Chipko, as a means of non-violent protest.

But the struggle was far from over, as the same company was awarded more ash trees, in the Phata forest, 80 km (50 miles) away from Gopeshwar. Here again, due to local opposition, starting on 20 June 1974, the contractors retreated after a stand-off that lasted a few days. Thereafter, the villagers of Phata and Tarsali formed a vigil group and watched over the trees until December, when they had another successful stand-off when the activists reached the site in time. The lumbermen retreated leaving behind the five ash trees that felled.

A few months later, the final flashpoint began when the government announced an auction scheduled in January 1974, for 2,500 trees near Reni village, overlooking the Alaknanda River. Bhatt set out for the villages in the Reni area and incited the villagers, who decided to protest against the actions of the government by hugging the trees. Over the next few weeks, rallies and meetings continued in the Reni area.

On 25 March 1974, the day the lumbermen were to cut the trees, the men of Reni village and DGSS workers were in Chamoli, diverted by the state government and contractors to a fictional compensation payment site, while back home labourers arrived by the truckload to start logging operations. A local girl rushed to inform Gaura Devi, the head of the village Mahila Mangal Dal, at Reni village (Laata was her ancestral home and Reni adopted home). Gaura Devi led 27 of the village women to the site and confronted the loggers. When all talking failed, and the loggers started to shout and abuse the women, threatening them with guns, the women resorted to hugging the trees to stop them from being felled. The women kept an all-night vigil guarding their trees against the cutters until a few of them relented and left the village. The next day, when the men and leaders returned, the news of the movement spread to the neighbouring Laata and other villages including Henwalghati, and more people joined in. Eventually, after a four-day stand-off, the contractors left.

The effect
The news soon reached the state capital, where the then state Chief Minister, Hemwati Nandan Bahuguna, set up a committee to look into the matter, which eventually ruled in favour of the villagers. This became a turning point in the history of eco-development struggles in the region and around the world.

The struggle soon spread across many parts of the region, and such spontaneous stand-offs between the local community and timber merchants occurred at several locations, with hill women demonstrating their new-found power as non-violent activists. As the movement gathered shape under its leaders, the name Chipko movement was attached to their activities. According to Chipko historians, the term originally used by Bhatt was the word "angalwaltha" in the Garhwali language for "embrace", which later was adapted to the Hindi word, Chipko, which means to stick.

Over the next five years, the movement spread to many districts in the region, and within a decade throughout the Uttarakhand Himalayas. Larger issues of ecological and economic exploitation of the region were raised. The villagers demanded that no forest-exploiting contracts should be given to outsiders and local communities should have effective control over natural resources like land, water, and forests. They wanted the government to provide low-cost materials to small industries and ensure development of the region without disturbing the ecological balance. The movement took up economic issues of landless forest workers and asked for guarantees of minimum wage. Globally Chipko demonstrated how environment causes, up until then considered an activity of the rich, were a matter of life and death for the poor, who were all too often the first ones to be devastated by an environmental tragedy. Several scholarly studies were made in the aftermath of the movement. In 1977, in another area, women tied sacred threads, called Rakhi, around trees destined for felling. According to the Hindu tradition of Raksha Bandhan, the Rakhi signifies a bond between brother and sisters. They declared that the trees would be saved even if it cost them their lives.

Women's participation in the Chipko agitation was a very novel aspect of the movement. The forest contractors of the region usually doubled up as suppliers of alcohol to men. Women held sustained agitations against the habit of alcoholism and broadened the agenda of the movement to cover other social issues. The movement achieved a victory when the government issued a ban on felling of trees in the Himalayan regions for fifteen years in 1980 by then Prime Minister Indira Gandhi, until the green cover was fully restored. One of the prominent Chipko leaders, Gandhian Sunderlal Bahuguna, took a 5,000 kilometre (3000 mile) trans-Himalaya foot march in 1981–83, spreading the Chipko message to a far greater area. Gradually, women set up cooperatives to guard local forests, and also organized fodder production at rates conducive to local environment. Next, they joined in land rotation schemes for fodder collection, helped replant degraded land, and established and ran nurseries stocked with species they selected.

Participants

One of Chipko's most salient features was the mass participation of female villagers. As the backbone of Uttarakhand's Agrarian economy, women were most directly affected by environmental degradation and deforestation, and thus related to the issues most easily. How much this participation impacted or derived from the ideology of Chipko has been fiercely debated in academic circles.

Despite this, both female and male activists did play pivotal roles in the movement including Gaura Devi, Sudesha Devi, Bachni Devi, Chandi Prasad Bhatt, Sundarlal Bahuguna, Govind Singh Rawat, Dhoom Singh Negi, Shamsher Singh Bisht and Ghanasyam Raturi, the Chipko poet, whose songs are still popular in the Himalayan region. Chandi Prasad Bhatt was awarded the Ramon Magsaysay Award in 1982, and Sunderlal Bahuguna was awarded the Padma Vibhushan in 2009.

Legacy 
In Tehri District, Chipko activists would go on to protest limestone mining in the Doon Valley  in the 1980s, as the movement spread through the Dehradun district, which had earlier seen deforestation of its forest cover leading to heavy loss of flora and fauna. Finally quarrying was banned after years of agitation by Chipko activists, followed by a vast public drive for afforestation, which turned around the valley, just in time. Also in the 1980s, activists like Bahuguna protested against construction of the Tehri dam on the Bhagirathi River, which went on for the next two decades, before founding the Beej Bachao Andolan, the Save the Seeds movement, that continues to the present day.

Over time, as a United Nations Environment Programme report mentioned, Chipko activists started "working a socio-economic revolution by winning control of their forest resources from the hands of a distant bureaucracy which is only concerned with the selling of forestland for making urban-oriented products". The Chipko movement became a benchmark for socio-ecological movements in other forest areas of Himachal Pradesh, Rajasthan and Bihar; in September 1983, Chipko inspired a similar, Appiko movement in Karnataka state of India, where tree felling in the Western Ghats and Vindhyas was stopped. In Kumaon region, Chipko took on a more radical tone, combining with the general movement for a separate Uttarakhand state, which was eventually achieved in 2001

In recent years, the movement not only inspired numerous people to work on practical programmes of water management, energy conservation, afforestation, and recycling, but also encouraged scholars to start studying issues of environmental degradation and methods of conservation in the Himalayas and throughout India.

On 26 March 2004, Reni, Laata, and other villages of the Niti Valley celebrated the 30th anniversary of the Chipko movement, where all the surviving original participants united. The celebrations started at Laata, the ancestral home of Gaura Devi, where Pushpa Devi, wife of late Chipko Leader Govind Singh Rawat, Dhoom Singh Negi, Chipko leader of Henwalghati, Tehri Garhwal, and others were celebrated. From here a procession went to Reni, the neighbouring village, where the actual Chipko action took place on 26 March 1974. This marked the beginning of worldwide methods to improve the present situation. Recently, by following the legacy of the Chipko movement, in 2017 rapid deforestation over the century-old trees, forming almost a canopy in Jessore Road of the district of North 24 Parganas, West Bengal, has also flicked off a huge movement in the form of the campaign of saving 4000 trees by the local masses.

On 26 March 2018, a Chipko movement conservation initiative was marked by a Google Doodle on its 45th anniversary.

See also
 Bishnoi
 Indian Council of Forestry Research and Education
 Khejarli massacre
 List of forest research institutes in India
 Sunderlal Bahuguna
 Van Mahotsav
 Van Vigyan Kendra (VVK) Forest Science Centres
 Pamela Singh, Photographs of the Chipko Movement, sepiaEYE https://www.sepiaeye.com/exhibitions#/pamela-singh-chipko-tree-huggers-of-the-himalayas

References

Citations

General bibliography 
 J. Bandopadhyay and Vandana Shiva: "The Chipko Movement Against Limestone Quarrying in Doon Valley" in: Lokayan Bulletin, 5:3, 1987, pp. 19–25 online
 Somen Chakraborty: A Critique of Social Movements in India: Experiences of Chipko, Uttarakhand, and Fishworkers' Movement, Indian Social Institute, 1999. .
 Guha, Ramachandra: The Unquiet woods: ecological change and peasant resistance in the Himalaya, Berkeley, Calif. [etc.]: University of California Press, Expanded edition 2000.
 Dr. Sindhu Mary Jacob, Satyendra Tripathi: Chipko movement: Uttarakhand women's bid to save forest wealth. Pub. by public Action, 1978.
 JShiva: Chipko: India's Civilisational Response to the Forest Crisis. Indian National Trust for Art and Cultural Heritage. Pub. by INTACH, 1986.
 Anupam Mishra, Satyendra Tripathi: Chipko movement: Uttarakhand women's bid to save forest wealth. Pub. by public Action, 1978.
 Rangan, Haripriya: Of Myths and movements: rewriting Chipko into Himalayan history, London [etc.]: Verso, 2000. .  Excerpts
 Shepard, Mark  Chapter 4 – "Hug the Trees". Gandhi today: a report on Mahatma Gandhi's successors. Published by Shepard Publications, 1987. .
 Shiva, Vandana. Chapter 4 – "The Chipko movement" Ecology and the Politics of Survival: Conflicts Over Natural Resources in India. United Nations University Press. Sage Publications. 1991. .
 Thomas Weber, Hugging the trees: the story of the Chipko movement, Viking, 1988.

External links
 Standing up for trees: Women's role in the Chipko Movement at FAO (United Nations)
 Resources on Chipko movement
 Chipko Heritage
 The Chipko movement and women

1974 in India
Chamoli district
Environment of Uttarakhand
Environmental movements
Environmental protests
Environmentalism in India
Forestry in India
History of environmentalism
History of Uttarakhand (1947–present)
Nature conservation in India
Social history of India
Social movements in India
Trees
Women in forestry
Women in India